Jhim Jan Gerardus van Bemmel (born 15 November 1959 in Boskoop) is a former Dutch politician. As a member of the Party for Freedom (Partij voor de Vrijheid) he was an MP from 17 June 2010 to 19 September 2012. Since 6 July 2012 he was an independent politician. He focused on matters of spatial planning, consumers, tourism, telecom, postal market, administrative burden and environmental law.

References 
  Parlement.com biography

1959 births
Living people
Independent politicians in the Netherlands
Members of the House of Representatives (Netherlands)
Party for Freedom politicians
People from Boskoop
21st-century Dutch politicians
Dutch atheists